Enough Rope is a 1963 French thriller film directed by Claude Autant-Lara. The film is an adaptation of Patricia Highsmith's 1954 novel The Blunderer.

Plot synopsis
Walter Saccard and Melchior Kimmel are both suspected for the murder of their wives and set out to prove their innocence.

Cast
 Maurice Ronet as Walter Saccard
 Robert Hossein as Corby
 Marina Vlady as Ellie
 Gert Fröbe as Melchior Kimmel
 Yvonne Furneaux as Clara
 Paulette Dubost as Mme Kimmel
 Laurence Badie as la serveuse
 Clara Gansard as Claudia

Release
The film was released in France on 11 January 1963 through Tamasa Distribution. It had 946,050 admissions in France.

References

External links

1960s psychological thriller films
1963 films
Films based on American novels
Films based on works by Patricia Highsmith
Films directed by Claude Autant-Lara
French thriller films
1960s French-language films
1960s French films